Salwa is an area in Hawalli Governorate in Kuwait City, Kuwait, bordering Rumaithiya to the north, Bayan and Mishref to the west, Messila to the south and the Persian Gulf to the east.

External links
Embassies in Kuwait

 Suburbs of Kuwait City
 Areas of Hawalli Governorate